Staro Nagoričane is a village in North Macedonia and the seat of the Staro Nagoričane municipality. The village is primarily known for its 11th century Church of St. George, first constructed in 1071 during Byzantine Macedonia, and reconstructed between 1313 and 1318 by Serbian King Stefan Milutin.

Geography

The village is located in the Sredorek region.

Culture
Church of St. George

Demographics
As of the 2021 census, Staro Nagoričane had 493 residents with the following ethnic composition:
Serbs 302 (61.3%)
Macedonians 169 (34.3%)
Persons for whom data are taken from administrative sources 18 (3.7%)
Others 4

According to the 2002 census, the village had 555 inhabitants, out of which 452 (~80%) were Serbs, 100 (~20%) were Macedonians, 1 was Romani, and 2 Others.

Annotations
Name: The official name is Staro Nagoričane, while it has been historically spelled Staro Nagoričano (Старо Нагоричано) and Staro Nagoričino (Старо Нагоричино)

References

External links

Staro Nagoričane Municipality
Villages in Staro Nagoričane Municipality
Serb communities in North Macedonia